European Society of Gene & Cell Therapy (ESGCT) formerly European Society of Gene Therapy (ESGT) is a legally registered professional body which emerged from a small working group in 1992 that focused on human gene therapy.

The objectives of the ESGT include the following:

 promote basic and clinical research in gene therapy;
 facilitate education (and the exchange of information and technologies) related to gene transfer and therapy;
 serve as a professional adviser to the gene therapy community and various regulatory bodies in Europe.

The official journal of the ESGT is The Journal of Gene Medicine.

Collaborations
The ESGT works with other entities in the scientific communities in the event that an adverse effect to a specific gene therapy is discovered. Investigations the ESGT has been involved with include the adverse effects discovered during the French X-SCID gene therapy trial. The ESGT hosted a forum of 500 researchers from various facilities around the world, including representatives from the Stanford University and the Sloan Kettering Cancer Research Center.

External links
Official Site
Researchers from Israel, Southern California to Present Stem Cell Symposium
Researchers team up to tackle cystic fibrosis

Genetics organizations
European medical and health organizations